Aznahri (also Romanized as Aznahrī and Eznahrī) is a village in Garin Rural District, Zarrin Dasht District, Nahavand County, Hamadan Province, Iran. At the 2006 census, its population was 1,066, in 245 families.

References 

Populated places in Nahavand County